The Melbourne Cup was a film about the two mile horse race won by Acrasia which took place on Tuesday, 1 November 1904.

Franklyn Barrett filmed the 1904 Melbourne Cup. This was the first time the Melbourne Cup had been filmed from start to finish.

It has been acclaimed as the first horse race filmed in full.

References

External links

1900s Australian films
1900s short documentary films
1904 films
Australian short documentary films
Australian horse racing films
Australian silent short films
Australian black-and-white films
Films about horses
Melbourne Cup
Films directed by Franklyn Barrett